Tyler, the Creator is an American rapper and record producer who has received various awards and nominations including a Brit Award, a Grammy Award and an MTV Video Music Award. He released his first studio album Goblin in 2011. At the 2011 MTV Video Music Awards he was nominated for Video of the Year for the single "Yonkers" from the album, he also won Best New Artist for the song. He received his first Grammy Award nomination in 2013 for Album of the Year as a featured artist in Frank Ocean's debut album Channel Orange. In 2013, he released his second album, Wolf, and in 2015, he released his third, Cherry Bomb. His fourth album, Flower Boy, was released in 2017 and was nominated for Best Rap Album at the 60th Annual Grammy Awards.

In 2019, he released his fifth album IGOR, the album was met with critical acclaim and won the Grammy Award for Best Rap Album and was nominated for the BET Hip Hop Award for Album of the Year. The following year, he won International Male Solo Artist at the 40th Brit Awards. His sixth album, Call Me If You Get Lost, was released in 2021 and received two nominations at the 64th Annual Grammy Awards, for Best Rap Album, his third nomination in the category, and for Best Melodic Rap Performance for the song "WusYaName".

Annie Awards
The Annie Awards are presented annually by ASIFA-Hollywood to recognize excellence in animation.

BET Awards
The BET Awards at presented by BET to celebrate African Americans in music, acting, sports and other fields of entertainment.

BET Hip Hop Awards
The BET Hip Hop Awards are presented by BET to recognize the best in hip hop music.

Brit Awards
The Brit Awards are presented by the British Phonographic Industry to honour excellence in music both from the United Kingdom and the world.

Grammy Awards
The Grammy Award is an honor awarded by The Recording Academy to recognize outstanding achievement in the mainly English-language music industry.

MTV Video Music Awards
The MTV Video Music Award is an award presented by the cable channel MTV to honor the best in the music video medium.

NME Awards
The NME Awards is an annual Popular music awards show in the United Kingdom.

UK Music Video Awards
The UK Music Video Awards is an annual celebration of creativity, technical excellence and innovation in music video and moving image for music from United Kingdom and the world.

Various awards and nominations

References

External links
 

Tyler the Creator